Suffer in Hell is the sixth studio album by American deathcore band Chelsea Grin. It was released on November 11, 2022. It is the first release from the band without drummer/co-vocalist Pablo Viveros since their 2012 EP Evolve; Viveros has been on hiatus from the band since 2021 and had made commitments with another artist in the downtime during COVID-19 pandemic to perform and tour. They revealed he was still a member of the band, but would continue to take a hiatus from the band to fulfill his commitments, with session member Nathan Pearson taking his place.

Suffer in Hell is the first part of a double album split as two separate releases, with the second part, Suffer in Heaven, to be released on March 17, 2023. Suffer in Hell was released to critical acclaim, with Boolin Tunes referring to it as "an absolute deathcore masterclass" and the band's "finest work to date." One of the tracks, "Forever Bloom" features a posthumous vocal appearance from the late Trevor Strnad of The Black Dahlia Murder.

Track listing

Personnel 
Chelsea Grin
 Tom Barber – lead vocals
 Stephen Rutishauser – guitars
 David Flinn – bass
 Nathen Pearson – drums

Additional musicians
 Trevor Strnad – guest vocals on track 2

Additional personnel
 Jeff Dunne and Zach Jones – production

References 

2022 albums
Chelsea Grin albums